Sandon River, an open mature wave dominated, barrier estuary, is located in the Northern Rivers region of New South Wales, Australia.

Course and features
Sandon River rises of the eastern slopes of the Summervale Range, west of Blue Gum Flat and flows generally northeast before reaching its mouth at the Coral Sea of the South Pacific Ocean below Sandon Bluffs; descending  over its  course.

See also

 Rivers of New South Wales
 Rivers in Australia

References

External links
 

 

Rivers of New South Wales
Northern Rivers